The 2014 BRD Năstase Țiriac Trophy was a tennis tournament played on outdoor clay courts and held at Arenele BNR in Bucharest, Romania, from 21 to 27 April 2014. It was the 22nd edition of the BRD Năstase Țiriac Trophy tournament, and was part of the ATP World Tour 250 Series of the 2014 ATP World Tour. The event also futured an exhibition match with Goran Ivanišević, Cédric Pioline, Ilie Năstase and Andrei Pavel.

Points and prize money

Point distribution

Prize money 

* per team

Singles main-draw entrants

Seeds 

 1 Rankings are as of April 14, 2014.

Other entrants  
The following players received wildcards into the singles main draw:
  Patrick Ciorcilă  
  Marius Copil
  Grigor Dimitrov

The following players received entry from the qualifying draw:
  Nikoloz Basilashvili
  Ričardas Berankis
  Paul-Henri Mathieu
  Adrian Ungur

Withdrawals 
Before the tournament 
  Julien Benneteau
  Guillermo García López
  Florian Mayer
  Janko Tipsarević (knee injury)
  Bernard Tomic

Retirements
  Gaël Monfils (right ankle strain)

Doubles main-draw entrants

Seeds 

 Rankings are as of April 14, 2014.

Other entrants 
The following pairs received wildcards into the doubles main draw:
  Victor Crivoi /  Adrian Ungur
  Victor Hănescu /  Andrei Pătrui

Withdrawals
During the tournament
  Vasek Pospisil (back strain)

Finals

Singles 

  Grigor Dimitrov defeated  Lukáš Rosol, 7–6(7–2), 6–1

Doubles 

  Jean-Julien Rojer /  Horia Tecău defeated  Mariusz Fyrstenberg /  Marcin Matkowski, 6–4, 6–4

References

External links
Official website

 

BRD Nastase Tiriac Trophy
Romanian Open
BRD Nastase Tiriac Trophy
April 2014 sports events in Europe